The Three Degrees are an American vocal trio.

The Three Degrees or Three Degrees may also refer to:

The Three Degrees (album), a 1973 studio album by the trio
"The Three Degrees" (song), a 2005 single by Irish singer Tara Blaise
threedegrees, a communication and P2P application produced by Microsoft and frequently referred to as Three Degrees
3o Kelvin (3K rounded from 2.7K) cosmic microwave radiation, see cosmic microwave background
Cyrille Regis, Laurie Cunningham, and Brendon Batson, three Black British football players who played for West Bromwich Albion F.C. during the late 1970s, popularly nicknamed "the Three Degrees" after the pop group.

See also
Three degrees of influence, a theory in the realm of Social Networks
Third degree (disambiguation)